Brampton railway station is on the East Suffolk Line in the east of England, serving the villages of Brampton, Redisham and surrounding hamlets in Suffolk. It is commonly suffixed as Brampton (Suffolk) in order to distinguish it from the station of the same name in Cumbria.

It is managed by Abellio Greater Anglia, which also operates all the trains.

History

The ESR was absorbed by the Eastern Counties Railway in 1859, which in turn was amalgamated with other railways to form the Great Eastern Railway (GER) in 1862. The GER's successor, the London and North Eastern Railway, added the county suffix "Brampton (Suffolk)" on 1 June 1928.

The station featured in 'No Trace of Tracy', the fourth episode of the first series of Jonathan Creek.

Services
 the typical Monday-Sunday off-peak service at Brampton is as follows:

References

External links 

Railway stations in Suffolk
DfT Category F1 stations
Former Great Eastern Railway stations
Railway stations in Great Britain opened in 1854
Greater Anglia franchise railway stations
1854 establishments in England
Railway request stops in Great Britain
Waveney District